Deh Now-e Sarab (also Romanized as Deh Now-e Sarāb; also known as Deh Now) is a village in Rahdar Rural District, in the Central District of Rudan County, Hormozgan Province, Iran. At the 2006 census, its population was 96, in 21 families.

References 

Populated places in Rudan County